Patrice M. "Patti" Rizzo (born June 19, 1960) is an American professional golfer and golf instructor.

Amateur career
Rizzo was born in Hollywood, Florida. A collegiate All-American at the University of Miami, among her significant victories as an amateur were the Eastern Women's Amateur and Mexican Amateur in 1980, a year when she was also runner-up to Juli Inkster at the U.S. Women's Amateur and individual winner when the U.S. team won the 1980 Espirito Santo Trophy. Her performance in the 1980 season resulted in Golf Digest ranking her the No.1 female amateur in the U.S. The following year her wins included the North and South Women's Amateur at Pinehurst and she earned medalist honors at the 1981 U.S. Women's Amateur. Golf Magazine ranked her the No. 1 collegiate player for 1981.

Professional career
In 1982, Rizzo joined the LPGA Tour where she earned Rookie of the Year honors. She played on the Tour regularly for 10 years during which time she won four tournaments.

Growing disenchanted with pro golf, Rizzo quit the LPGA in 1991. After not playing any golf at all for several months, Rizzo accepted an invitation to play in a LPGA of Japan Tour event. Rizzo won it and soon afterwards accepted a one-year exemption to play the LPGA of Japan Tour. Rizzo won three tournaments in Japan in 1992, bringing her total victories there to nine.

Rizzo was the head coach of the Barry University women's golf program from 2004 until 2010 when she became coach at the University of Miami.

Amateur wins
1980 Trans-National, Eastern Amateur, Mexican Amateur, Espirito Santo Trophy (individual winner)
1981 North and South Women's Amateur, South Atlantic Harder Hall Invitational

Professional wins

LPGA Tour (4)

LPGA Tour playoff record (1–0)

LPGA of Japan Tour (9)
1985 (1) Daio Paper Elleair Ladies Open
1986 (1) Takara Invitational
1988 (2) Takara Invitational, Daio Paper Elleair Ladies Open
1989 (1) Daikin Orchid Ladies Golf Tournament
1991 (1) Yukijirushi Ladies Tokai Classic
1992 (3) Nasu Ogawa Ladies Pro Golf Tournament, Takara World Invitational, Fujitsu Ladies

Other (2)
1985 (1) Sun City International
1989 (1) Mazda Champions (with Mike Hill)

U.S. national team appearances
Amateur
Espirito Santo Trophy: 1980 (winners)

References

External links

Patti Rizzo profile – Barry University

American female golfers
Miami Hurricanes women's golfers
LPGA Tour golfers
College golf coaches in the United States
Golfers from Florida
Sportspeople from Hollywood, Florida
1960 births
Living people